Dominic Wong Shing-wah, GBS, OBE, JP (13 April 1942 – May 2012) was an official in the Hong Kong Government. Wong retired in 2002 from the Hong Kong Government as Secretary for Housing, after a 40-year career in public service.

Career
In 1962, Wong joined the Hong Kong Government and served in the Certificated Master, Executive Officer and Trade Officer Grades. In 1973, Wong became an Administrative Officer. In 1996, he was promoted to the rank of Director of Bureau.

Wong had served in various policy bureaus and departments. Senior positions held by Wong include: Deputy Secretary for the Civil Service (January 1984 – January 1988); Deputy Secretary for Education and Manpower (January 1988 – September 1989); Postmaster General (September 1989 – May 1992) and Director of Education (July 1992 – December 1994). He began his position as Secretary for Housing in December 1994 and continued to hold the position after the handover of Hong Kong in July 1997.

During his tenure as Housing Secretary, his long-term strategic planning of housing was praised as forward-looking, and shortened the queuing time for public housing from 5 to 6 years to 3 years. He retired in 2002,and died of disease in early May 2012 after being diagnosed with laryngeal cancer.

Awards
 Gold Bauhinia Star (2000) 
 Honorary President of the Society for the Promotion of Hospice Care and Honorary President of the International Institute of Management

References

1942 births
2012 deaths
Government officials of Hong Kong
Recipients of the Gold Bauhinia Star
Officers of the Order of the British Empire
Date of death unknown
HK LegCo Members 1985–1988